The Master Individual national bridge championship was held at the fall American Contract Bridge League (ACBL) North American Bridge Championship (NABC); it was held from 1931 until 1960 after which it was discontinued.

Trophy

The event was contested for the Karn Trophy from 1931 to 1933 and the Steiner Trophy from 1934 to 1960.

Described as “a magnificent gold cup” by The Bridge World, the Karn trophy was donated by Willard S. Karn in 1931 for the National Individual Masters Championship. While refuting allegations of impropriety in 1933, Karn withdrew his trophy. It was replaced in 1934 by the Steiner Trophy donated by Albert Steiner and Philip Steiner of Cincinnati, Ohio.

Winners

The Master Individual was contested thirty times with a single winner on every occasion. The inaugural event was played at the home of P. Hal Sims in Deal, New Jersey, 5–7 September 1931 and won by Karn himself. Howard Schenken won in 1932 and David Bruce was the final winner in 1933.

Four people won The Master Individual twice: B. Jay Becker, George Rapée, Harry Fishbein, and Morrie Elis. Becker was the sole runner-up three times and tied once; Fishbein and Elis were runners-up once each. Elinor Murdoch was second in 1933 and first in 1934. Sylvia Klein in 1958 was the only other woman champion.

References

Sources

 "Search Results: Masters Individual". ACBL. Visit "NABC Winners"; select a Discontinued NABC. Retrieved 2014-06-04. 

North American Bridge Championships